Batrachedra dolichoscia is a moth in the family Batrachedridae. It is found in Colombia. It is part of the genus Batrachedra.

References

Natural History Museum Lepidoptera generic names catalog

Batrachedridae
Moths described in 1928